Jeffrey Shuman (born 1962) is an American-French bank robber, dubbed "The Vaulter", considered to be one of Canada's most prolific bank robbers. In 1994, he pleaded guilty to robbing 14 banks in the United States, receiving a 12-year sentence, but was released in 2004, and fled the country while on parole. He then robbed 21 banks in Canada, before fleeing to France on his French passport. In 2016, he was extradited to Canada, and in 2017, was sentenced to 15 years in prison and ordered to pay back nearly $450,000 in restitution after pleading guilty to seven counts of robbery using a firearm.

Early life
Shuman was born in Los Angeles County, California, U.S. in 1962. He is a dual citizen of the United States and France, acquired through his maternal grandmother who immigrated to the United States from Southern France in 1946. After high school, he served in the U.S. Navy and studied fashion merchandising before working in the mortgage and banking field between 1985 and 1987. He moved to Miami, Florida in the early 1990s and worked as a land developer, living a lavish lifestyle despite having no sales for three years.

Bank robberies

United States
Between 1992 and 1993, Shuman robbed over a dozen banks in Florida and Tennessee jumping over the counters and raiding the cash drawers. In 1993, while driving in Alabama, he was stopped for speeding; officers searched the trunk of his rental car and found a trash bag with a police radio scanner, an air pistol, plastic gloves, maps of Florida, Alabama, Georgia and Tennessee and baseball caps under the spare tire. He only received a traffic citation, but within days, a warrant was issued for bank robbery and the FBI arrested him in Miami. In 1994, he pleaded guilty to robbing 14 banks, receiving a 12-year sentence, but was released in 2004. He fled the United States while on parole. He was dubbed the "Reebok Bandit" by FBI agents because he wore tennis shoes during his heists.

Canada
Six years later, Shuman began robbing banks in Canada, 12 in York Region, Ontario (Markham, Richmond Hill and Vaughan), four in Calgary, Alberta, two in the Region of Peel, Ontario, and one in each of Hamilton, Ottawa and Toronto between 2010 and 2015 – a total of 21 robberies in Canada. Shuman became more violent as the robberies progressed, waiting for employees to open the banks in the morning and holding them at gun point locking them in the vault. He managed to steal a total of about $450,000 from the robberies, most of which were successful.

Extradition and sentence
After Shuman's last robbery in Mississauga, Ontario, on May 8, 2015, he fled Canada to France using his French passport. York Regional Police issued an international arrest warrant, and four months later, on September 15, 2015, with the help of French, German, Swiss and Danish authorities who monitored his activities in Europe, tracked him down to Geneva, Switzerland, where he was arrested on his way from France. Shuman was due for extradition to Canada on February 23, 2016, however, Shuman faked chest pains over French airspace in an attempt to force the commercial plane to land in France since the country does not extradite their citizens. Instead, the plane landed in London, England where Shuman was taken to hospital with no evidence of heart problems. Due to this situation, commercial airlines would not allow him to fly, so a private jet was arranged landing in Toronto. Shuman faced 31 criminal charges, including 11 counts of armed robbery.

On July 25, 2017, Shuman was sentenced to 15 years in prison and ordered to pay back nearly $450,000 in restitution, in a Newmarket courthouse, after pleading guilty to seven counts of robbery using a firearm.

References

1962 births
American bank robbers
Canadian bank robbers
French bank robbers
Fugitives
Living people
People convicted of robbery
People extradited to Canada
People extradited from Switzerland